The 2016–17 Evansville Purple Aces men's basketball team represented the University of Evansville during the 2016–17 NCAA Division I men's basketball season. The Purple Aces, led by 10th-year head coach Marty Simmons, played their home games at the Ford Center as members of the Missouri Valley Conference. They finished the season 16–17, 6–12 to finish in eighth place in MVC play. They defeated Indiana State in the MVC tournament before losing to Illinois State in the quarterfinals.

Previous season
The Purple Aces finished the 2015–16 season with a record of 25–9, 12–6 in Missouri Valley play to finish in a tie for second place. They defeated Missouri State and Indiana State in the Missouri Valley tournament to advance to the championship game where they lost to Northern Iowa. Despite having 25 wins, they did not participate in a postseason tournament.

Preseason 
Evansville was picked to finish ninth in the conference's preseason poll.

Offseason

Departures

Incoming transfers

2016 recruiting class

Roster

Schedule and results

|-
!colspan=9 style=| Non-conference regular season

|-
!colspan=9 style=| Missouri Valley regular season

|-
!colspan=12 style=| Missouri Valley tournament

Source

References

Evansville Purple Aces men's basketball seasons
Evansville
2016 in sports in Indiana
2017 in sports in Indiana